Apolakkia is a Greek village in the municipal unit of South Rhodes, on the island of Rhodes, South Aegean region. In 2011 its population was 496.

Geography
The village is located in a valley between two hills, near the Aegean Coast, 78 km from the town of Rhodes and 37 from Lindos. Nearest villages are Arnitha (3,5 km), Istrios and Monolithos.

Main sights
Apolakkia Beach, also known as Limni, is a receptive place for summer tourism. The beach, on the west side of Rhodes Coast, is 3,500 m long and 35m wide.

Near Apolakkia are located the ancient ruins of the churches of Agia Irini and Agios Giorgios. Some km in north of the settlement is located the Apolakkia Lake.

References

External links

South Rhodes website

Populated places in Rhodes